The Izmailovo Hotel is a four-building hotel located in the Izmaylovo District of Moscow, Russia. It is the largest hotel in Europe, and was the largest hotel in the world from 1980 to 1993. Built for the 1980 Summer Olympics to accommodate sportsmen and visitors, the hotel remains popular among Russians and foreign guests.

History
When it opened in 1980, it surpassed the Rossiya Hotel (1967–2006) as the largest hotel in the world. It held the record until 1993, when it was surpassed by MGM Grand Las Vegas. Today, Izmailovo Hotel is still the largest hotel in Europe with 5,000 rooms divided between four buildings: Alpha, Beta, Vega and Gamma-Delta.

Gallery

See also

 Rossiya Hotel
 List of largest hotels
 List of largest hotels in Europe

References

External links 
 

Hotels in Moscow
Tourist attractions in Moscow
Hotel buildings completed in 1980
Hotels established in 1980
1980 establishments in the Soviet Union
Hotels built in the Soviet Union